BK Jūrmala is a professional basketball club based in Jūrmala, Latvia. It is currently playing in the Latvian–Estonian Basketball League, previously have played in Latvian Basketball League (since 2005) and Baltic Basketball League. The club was founded in 1999 and until 2006 was known as the I.O.S./Jūrmala, then Jūrmalas Sports/Fēnikss.

Roster

Season by season

References

External links
Official website —

Sport in Jūrmala
Jurmala